Tarpianjoki, sometimes also Viialanjoki,  is a river in Pirkanmaa, Finland.

References
WSOY Iso tietosanakirja 10, page. 245, WSOY 1997

Other webpages 

Rivers of Finland
Rivers of Akaa